Miller Park commonly refers to the baseball stadium in Milwaukee, Wisconsin, now known as American Family Field. It may also refer to:

Places

United States 
Listed alphabetically by state
 Joaquin Miller Park in Oakland, California
 Millers Pond State Park in Middlesex County, Connecticut
 Miller Park (Bloomington, Illinois), a public park
 Miller Park Zoo in Bloomington, Illinois
 Miller Park South, a nickname for Wrigley Field in Chicago, Illinois
 Rocky Miller Park, a baseball park in Evanston, Illinois
 East Main Street–Glen Miller Park Historic District, Richmond, Wayne County, Indiana
 Hart-Miller Island State Park, Chesapeake Bay, Maryland
 Miller Park (Omaha, Nebraska), a neighborhood
 Miller Park Elementary School in North Omaha
 Miller Park (North Omaha), a park in North Omaha
 Miller State Park in Hillsborough County, New Hampshire
 Robert J. Miller Air Park, a public-use airport in Ocean County, New Jersey
 Bledsoe–Miller Park, a park in Waco, Texas
 Miller Motorsport Park, former name of Utah Motorsports Campus in Grantsville, Utah
 Miller Park (Milwaukee), former name of the Major League Baseball stadium in Wisconsin
 Miller Park Way, a former highway designation in Milwaukee near the ballpark

Other places
Miller Park, Brisbane, a heritage-listed park in Queensland, Australia
Miller Park, Preston, a park in Lancashire, England

Other uses
 Ulmus americana 'Miller Park', a cultivar of the American elm tree

See also
 Park-Miller RNG, a type of random number generator
 Miller Field (disambiguation)